The Galina is a river of Vorarlberg, Austria.
 
With a length of about  it is one of the shortest rivers of Vorarlberg. It flows into the Ill between Frastanz and Feldkirch.

References

Rivers of Vorarlberg
Rivers of Austria